Junior Laloifi (born 25 September 1994) is an Australian rugby union player. His usual position is wing or fullback. Laloifi last played for Zebre in the Pro14 till July 2022.

Laloifi  represented Victoria at the Australian Schools Rugby Championships, and was selected for the Australia 'A' Schools team in 2012. He also represented Australia in rugby sevens later that year. Laloifi joined the Sunnybank rugby club in 2013 and played in the Queensland Premier Rugby grand final in 2014.

He was selected for the  team in the inaugural National Rugby Championship (NRC) in 2014, and went on to score the winning try in the team's grand final win over Perth at Ballymore that year. In his second season with Brisbane, Laloifi was the NRC competition's leading try scorer, claiming 14 tries in the regular season. In November 2015, Laloifi was selected as the 'Ballymore Kid' from a pool of forty eligible players in Queensland's NRC teams and he signed a contract with the Queensland Reds for the 2016 Super Rugby season.
He played for Italian team Zebre from 2019 to 2022.

References

External links
 Player stats on It's Rugby

1994 births
Australian sportspeople of Samoan descent
Australian rugby union players
Queensland Reds players
Rugby union fullbacks
Rugby union wings
Living people
Brisbane City (rugby union) players
Manawatu rugby union players
Zebre Parma players
Rugby union players from Hastings, New Zealand